Roger Essley is the artist, illustrator and author of Reunion, a children's book about a boy who travels into a photograph and reunites with his Grandpa. He has two artworks currently hanging at the Metropolitan Museum of Art. Essley is also dyslexic.

References

External links

Living people
American children's writers
American illustrators
Year of birth missing (living people)